CISPR 22 is analog standard to European standard EN 55022. This is the standard that is very often referenced in all European EMC standards, defining measurement methods, measurement equipment, limit lines and interpretation of applicability of limit lines, starting from household appliances to medical devices.

References

Electromagnetic compatibility